All's Fair (also known as Skirmish and Weekend Warriors) is a 1989 American comedy film directed by Rocky Lang and starring George Segal, Sally Kellerman, Robert Carradine, and Lou Ferrigno.

Premise 
A group of business executives play paintball war games over a weekend retreat, which turns into a battle of the sexes when the company's women are excluded from participation.

Cast 
 George Segal as Colonel
 Sally Kellerman as Florence
 Robert Carradine as Mark
 Jennifer Edwards as Ann
 Jane Kaczmarek as Linda
 John Kapelos as Eddie
 Lou Ferrigno as Klaus
 Steve Tyler as Norman
 Lindsay Parker as Kate
 Lee Wilkof as Finstermacher
 Mary M. Egan as Miss Bloom

Reception 
The film received poor reviews. Leonard Maltin described it as "dreadful", while Time Out London said it was a "dreary, unfunny mess", and Kevin Thomas of the Los Angeles Times called it "wretched business", although Thomas did praise Kellerman for her "style and panache" despite the "dire circumstances" of the film.

References

External links 
 

1989 comedy films
1989 films
American comedy films
1980s English-language films
1980s American films
English-language comedy films